Thomas James Churchill (March 10, 1824 – May 14, 1905) was an American politician who served as the 13th governor of Arkansas from 1881 to 1883. Before that, he was a senior officer of the Confederate States Army who commanded infantry in the Western and Trans-Mississippi theaters of the American Civil War.

Early life and education
Thomas James Churchill was born near Louisville, Kentucky. He graduated from St. Mary's College in Bardstown in 1844, then studied law at Transylvania University in Lexington. He served during the Mexican–American War, rising to the rank of first lieutenant in the 1st Kentucky Cavalry Regiment. The Mexican Army captured Churchill, who remained a prisoner of war until near the war's end. In 1848, Churchill moved to Little Rock, Arkansas, married the daughter of United States Senator Ambrose H. Sevier, and became a planter. Appointed by President James Buchanan, he was a postmaster from September 1857 to March 1861.

His nephew would use part of the family estate at Spring Grove, Kentucky, to construct Churchill Downs.

American Civil War

At the start of the American Civil War, Churchill joined the Confederate States Army cavalry as a colonel of the 1st Arkansas Mounted Rifles. His first combat took place at the Battle of Wilson's Creek near Springfield, Missouri. On March 4, 1862, he was promoted to brigadier-general and fought at the Siege of Corinth and soon thereafter took part in the Confederate Heartland Offensive. Churchill played an important role in the Battle of Richmond, commanding a division of men from Texas and Arkansas. Leading his division along a ravine that became known as "Churchill's Draw", he delivered a successful and surprising flanking attack. On February 17, 1864, Churchill was cited as one of three officers to receive special recognition in a Thanks of Confederate States Congress resolution for his actions at Richmond.

During the latter part of 1862, Churchill was transferred back to Arkansas and placed in charge of the fortifications at Arkansas Post. In January 1863, the Post was attacked and seized in the Battle of Arkansas Post by an overwhelming United States Army force under U.S. Maj. Gen. John Alexander McClernand. After his exchange, Churchill served for a brief time in the Army of Tennessee before once again being sent west of the Mississippi, where he continued his service in the Trans-Mississippi Department, commanding a division during the Red River Campaign. He played a significant role in the Battle of Jenkins' Ferry and was promoted to major-general on March 17, 1865.

Later life
Churchill was elected Treasurer of Arkansas in 1873. He was subsequently re-elected in 1875, 1877, and 1879. During the Brooks–Baxter War of 1874, Churchill supported Elisha Baxter and helped enroll volunteers in Baxter's militia. Elected governor of Arkansas in 1880, Churchill served until 1883. While governor, he was plagued by allegations of discrepancies in the treasurer's account from when he served as state treasurer. A special committee found a shortage in state funds, and a lawsuit was brought against him. He was ordered to repay the missing funds. Churchill died in Little Rock and was buried in historic Mount Holly Cemetery with military honors.

See also 
 List of Confederate States Army generals
 List of governors of Arkansas
 The Family (Arkansas politics)

Notes

References

External links

 
 Thomas James Churchill at the Historical Marker Database
 Thomas James Churchill at the National Governors Association
 Thomas James Churchill at The Political Graveyard
 
 

1824 births
1905 deaths
19th-century American politicians
American Civil War prisoners of war
American military personnel of the Mexican–American War
American planters
American slave owners
Arkansas postmasters
Buchanan administration personnel
Burials at Mount Holly Cemetery
Confederate States Army major generals
Conway-Johnson family
Deaths in Arkansas
Democratic Party governors of Arkansas
Mexican–American War prisoners of war held by Mexico
Military personnel from Louisville, Kentucky
People from Lexington, Kentucky
People from Louisville, Kentucky
People from Marion County, Kentucky
People of Arkansas in the American Civil War
People of the Brooks–Baxter War
Politicians from Little Rock, Arkansas
St. Mary's College (Kentucky) alumni
State treasurers of Arkansas
Transylvania University alumni